The College of Public Affairs and Development (CPAf) is one of the colleges in University of the Philippines Los Baños. It offers graduate instruction, research and extension programs that center on the study of communities in transition and their institution such as resource access, governance, policy and education, inter alia, and the intrinsic interplay among the institutions. It can be found at the forestry area or the upper campus of the university. That is approximately a hundred meters from the entrance to the UPLB College of Forestry and Natural Resources.

History
From its creation in 1998, the then-College of Public Affairs (CPAf) has made its mark in the field of development and governance studies. Through the years, CPAf has produced a significant number of graduates and a body of knowledge along institutional, policy and governance issues in the rural sector, in general, and in the agriculture and natural resources sectors, in particular.

Under a new name and a strong, dynamic “one-college-one-faculty” structure that helps strengthen and sustain its established innovations, the College of Public Affairs and Development now aims to offer more relevant academic courses and research and extension programs on development and governance studies.

CPAf is composed of an institute and two centers. These are the Institute for Governance and Rural Development (IGRD), Community Innovations Studies Center (CISC) and the Center for Strategic Planning and Policy Studies (CSPPS). IGRD offers the curricular programs of CPAf, including undergraduate courses in agrarian studies, education, and community education. The two centers, CISC and CSPPS, conduct research and extension programs.

Institute and Centers
Institute for Governance and Rural Development (IGRD)
Community Innovations Studies Center (CISC)
Center for Strategic Planning and Policy Studies (CSPPS)
Knowledge Management Office (KMO)

Graduate programs
Ph. D. Development Studies
MS/Ph. D. Extension Education
MS/Ph. D. Agricultural Education
MS/Ph. D. Community Development
Master/MS Development Management and Governance
Master in Public Affairs

References

External links
UPLB College of Public Affairs and Development Website

Educational institutions established in 1998
University of the Philippines Los Baños
1998 establishments in the Philippines